Matthew Pitts (born 25 December 1979) is an English footballer who started his career at Sunderland before he played in the Football League for Carlisle United and later joined Workington. He played either at right back or on the right side midfield.

Career statistics

A.  The "League" column constitutes appearances and goals (including those as a substitute) in the Football League.
B.  The "Other" column constitutes appearances and goals (including those as a substitute) in the Football League Trophy

References

Profile at 11v11.com

1979 births
Living people
Footballers from Middlesbrough
English footballers
Association football defenders
Association football midfielders
Sunderland A.F.C. players
Carlisle United F.C. players
Workington A.F.C. players
English Football League players
Northern Premier League players